George Edward Gardiner Snow (9 February 1910 – date of death unknown) was an English professional footballer who played as a inside left. He made over 200 appearances in the English Football League for Wrexham.

References

1910 births
Year of death unknown
Date of death unknown
English footballers
Association football midfielders
English Football League players
Walker Celtic F.C. players
Leeds United F.C. players
Rochdale A.F.C. players
Wrexham A.F.C. players